Madi Baba is a village and union council in the Mardan District of the Pakistani province Khyber Pakhtunkhwa.

References

Union councils of Mardan District
Populated places in Mardan District